The men's 4 x 100 metres relay at the 2010 European Athletics Championships was held at the Estadi Olímpic Lluís Companys on 31 July and 1 August.

Shortly after heat 2, it seemed that three teams (France, Poland and Switzerland) would qualify from heat 1, and five teams (Germany, Italy, Portugal, Russia and Spain) from heat 2, including Italy that finished second. However, it was announced that Italian team was disqualified, and subsequently Finnish team qualified from heat 1 to final. Later on, Italy made successful protest against Russia, so that Russia was disqualified and Italy proceeded to final.

Medalists

Records

Schedule

Results

Round 1
First 3 in each heat (Q) and 2 best performers (q) advance to the Final.

Heat 1

Heat 2

Summary

Final

References
 Round 1 Results
 Final Results
Full results

Relay 4 x 100
Relays at the European Athletics Championships